James Wesley Marsters (born August 20, 1962) is an American actor, musician, singer, comic book writer, and audiobook narrator. 

He is sometimes credited in various anime series and video games as David Gray and Sam Majesters in the series Dragon Ball Super and the video game Dragon Ball FighterZ respectively. He is best known for his role as the British punk vampire Spike in The WB series Buffy the Vampire Slayer and its spin-off, Angel. Since then, he has played the alien supervillain Brainiac along with Professor Milton Fine and Brainiac 5 on the Superman-inspired series Smallville, Captain John Hart on Torchwood and terrorist Barnabas Greeley in Syfy's Caprica. 

He appeared in a supporting role in the film P.S. I Love You, as Victor Hesse in the 2010 reboot of Hawaii Five-0, and Victor Stein in the Marvel series Runaways. He is also the voice of Zamasu along with Future Zamasu for the Funimation dub of the Dragon Ball franchise. He starred in the critically acclaimed two-part indie film A Bread Factory by director Patrick Wang. He also voiced the roles of Lex Luthor in the film Superman: Doomsday and the video game DC Universe Online, Sergei in Spider-Man: The New Animated Series, Mister Fantastic in The Super Hero Squad Show, Korvac in Ultimate Spider-Man, Captain Faro Argyus in Star Wars: The Clone Wars, Louis 'Match' Morris in Real Heroes: Firefighter, Nosferatu (which is miscredited as 'Dracula') in DuckTales and Various voices in Scooby-Doo: Mystery Incorporated.

Early life
Marsters was born in Greenville, California, the son of a United Methodist minister and social worker. He grew up with his brother, Paul, and sister, Susan, in Modesto, California. Dreaming about becoming an actor since he played Eeyore in Winnie the Pooh in 4th grade, Marsters joined the theatre group at Grace M. Davis High School and acted in many plays, including musicals. After graduation in 1980, Marsters studied at the Pacific Conservatory of the Performing Arts at Allan Hancock College in Santa Maria, California. In 1982, he moved to New York City to attend the Juilliard School, but was expelled from the program after just two years.

Acting career

Early roles
Marsters moved to Chicago, where his first professional acting role was Ferdinand in The Tempest at the Goodman Theatre in 1987. In this production, he was rolled onto the stage strapped naked to a wheel. He talks about this experience and his other theatrical roles at length in a 2020 interview with Michael Rosenbaum on the podcast 'Inside of You'. He also appeared with well-known Chicago companies such as the Northlight and the Bailiwick and with his own group, the Genesis Theatre Company. Marsters was nominated for a Joseph Jefferson Award for his performance of the lead role of Robespierre in the six-hour drama Incorruptible: The Life, Death and Dreams of Maximilian de Robespierre in 1989.

In 1990, he moved to Seattle and, with Liane Davidson and Greg Musick, formed the New Mercury Theatre. In this and other companies, Marsters was involved in a wide range of plays, including Teechers (a British play by John Godber), Anouilh's Antigone, an original work based on the Dr. Seuss books, and Shaw's Misalliance.

In 1992, he got his first TV acting job on Northern Exposure, in which he appeared for two episodes as a bellboy and a church minister. He has made guest appearances on television series including Andromeda, as well as the independent films Chance (2002), Winding Roads (1999), and the USA Network movie Cool Money (2005). In 1999, he had a small role in the remake of House on Haunted Hill as a TV cameraman.

Buffy the Vampire Slayer and Angel

Marsters attracted the general public's attention for his appearance as villain, and later anti-hero, Spike on season 2 of  the television series Buffy the Vampire Slayer. For the role, Marsters spoke with a London accent, for which he received informal coaching from British co-star Anthony Head.

Spike had been intended as a short role by creator Joss Whedon, who originally resisted Spike's popularity. "He made it very clear he did not want the show to be taken over by another romantic vampire," Marsters told 411Mania, adding "to Joss, vampires were supposed to be ugly, evil, and quick to be killed... when I was cast Joss did not imagine me to be popular; Spike was supposed to be dirty and evil, punk rock, and then dead." The massive fan response prevented his character from being killed off, allowing Spike a presence throughout the second season. 

There were no plans to bring Spike back as a regular on Buffy, until the character Cordelia Chase was moved to the spin-off show, Angel, and, as Marsters told 411Mania, "they needed someone to tell Buffy she was stupid and about to die, and [so] they decided to bring me back."  Marsters thought Spike would not last, because being a vampire, Spike was restricted to night-time scenes and could not feasibly interact with human characters as often as Cordelia. Surprisingly, Spike would become a romantic partner for Buffy, and Marsters a main cast member until the very end of the show.

After the conclusion of Buffy, Marsters carried Spike over to its spinoff, Angel, as a series regular in its fifth and final season. Marsters was asked to keep quiet about this, as his return was intended to be a surprise, but the network ruined it by promoting Spike's return as soon as it could, in order to create media buzz and attract advertisers. 

In April 2004, following the end of Angel, Marsters had Spike's trademark bleached hair shaved off for charity live on television during an episode of On Air with Ryan Seacrest.

When Angel was cancelled, there were plans for several TV movies based on the characters from the Buffy/Angel universe.  Talk of a Spike movie began in 2004,  and Whedon still had plans into 2006 before they were formally abandoned. Marsters said he would only return to play Spike if the project took place within five years, feeling he would become too old to play the character (an immortal) after that:

Aside from playing Spike, Marsters co-wrote a comic book one-shot for Dark Horse Comics, Buffy the Vampire Slayer: Spike and Dru.  After  Buffy the Vampire Slayer and Angel ended, Marsters became active with the canonical comic book series of both shows, particularly with stories centering around his character. A canonical graphic novel set during the seventh season of Buffy the Vampire Slayer, Spike: Into the Light, written by Marsters himself, was released by Dark Horse Comics on July 16, 2014.

Other work
Marsters has narrated the audiobooks for The Dresden Files, a series of detective novels with a supernatural bent and the side short story collection in the same universe, Side Jobs, were also recorded by Marsters. He did not originally record the Dresden book Ghost Story due to a scheduling conflict, leaving fellow Smallville alumnus and actor John Glover to record it; this caused a fairly noteworthy public outcry by audiobook listeners. He returned for the following book Cold Days. On March 24, 2015, Jim Butcher announced that a new version of the Ghost Story audiobook was to be released on April 21, 2015, with Marsters returning as the narrator in response to fan demands.

In 2005, Marsters filmed a thriller, Shadow Puppets, with Jolene Blalock. Late that year, Marsters appeared on the television series Smallville playing Dr. Milton Fine—the popular Superman villain Brainiac—in eight episodes throughout the show's fifth season. He reprised his role as Brainiac in a four-episode arc in the seventh season, and did a cameo voice-over in season eight. He returned for one episode in the show's final season. On October 29, 2005, Marsters presented two performances of his own abridged adaptation of Shakespeare's Macbeth with American actress Cheryl Puente as Lady Macbeth, followed by question and answer sessions with the audience and acoustic concerts in London.

In September 2006, Marsters' interpretation of Godber's Teechers was performed on the Queen Mary with two other actors in Los Angeles. This is a play he had received critical acclaim for as a stage actor prior to his television work. Marsters co-starred in the 2007 cinematic release of P.S. I Love You alongside Kathy Bates, Hilary Swank, and Gerard Butler. Released in September 2007, Marsters starred in the direct-to-DVD animated movie, Superman: Doomsday, providing the voice of iconic villain Lex Luthor. The film received mostly positive reviews.

In 2008, he guest-starred in Torchwood, a spin-off of the popular British science fiction television series Doctor Who, first appearing in the episode "Kiss Kiss, Bang Bang", as the nefarious omnisexual time traveller Captain John Hart. He reprised the role in the last two episodes of the second season.

He portrayed  "Piccolo Daimao" in the live-action film adaptation of the popular Dragon Ball manga and anime, directed by James Wong and produced by Stephen Chow, which was released worldwide on April 10, 2009.

On July 20, 2009, the film Moonshot aired on the History Channel in celebration of the 40th Anniversary of the 1969 moon landing. In this film, Marsters portrays Buzz Aldrin. On August 19, 2009, it was announced that he signed on for a role in Caprica as the terrorist leader Barnabas Greeley.

Also in August 2009, Marsters' science fiction western, High Plains Invaders aired on the Syfy Channel. In this alien invasion flick, Marsters portrays Sam Danville. It was announced in August 2010 that Marsters would be joining the cast of Syfy Channel series Three Inches as a series regular portraying Troy Hamilton, a former government agent who now leads a team of superheroes.

On June 24, 2011, Marsters appeared in an L.A. Theatre Works radio production of The Importance of Being Earnest, in the part of Sir John Worthing, which aired on June 25, 2011.

He has appeared on Supernatural in the episode "Shut Up, Dr. Phil", which aired October 21, 2011, alongside fellow Buffyverse co-star Charisma Carpenter. He also appeared in Warehouse 13 as Bennett Sutton, which aired in 2013.

In 2018, some sources speculated that Marsters is the voice actor of Dragon Ball Super character Zamasu. In October 2021, at Fan Expo Canada, both Marsters and Dragon Ball Super voice director Christopher Sabat publicly confirmed that he voiced Zamasu under the pseudonym of David Gray. As a fan of the Dragon Ball franchise, Marsters agreed to play the role of Zamasu in Dragon Ball Super at the suggestion of Sabat himself and Sean Schemmel when they met during a convention. Marsters did so entirely for free in order to "redeem himself with the Dragon Ball Z community" after his appearance in the critically-panned film Dragon Ball: Evolution.

Musical career
Marsters had played in bands and solo in bars and clubs for many years and enjoyed several successful sell-out solo gigs at Los Angeles clubs before forming a band. For these solo gigs he mainly performed covers of classic folk and rock musicians such as Tom Waits, Neil Young, James Taylor, and Bruce Springsteen. He sang in "Once More, with Feeling", a musical episode of Buffy: solo parts in "Walk Through the Fire" and "Something To Sing About", and "Rest in Peace" completely on his own.

In 2003–04, Marsters was the lead singer for the rock band Ghost of the Robot. Their debut album Mad Brilliant was released on February 2, 2003. The band played its first gigs in Los Angeles and Paris. They went on to play successful dates in and around Los Angeles and two sold-out tours of Europe in 2003 and 2004. In addition to Mad Brilliant, they released three singles ("Valerie", "David Letterman" and "New Man") and one mid-length EP, It's Nothing. All these releases carried tracks written and co-written by Marsters. Several of Ghost of the Robot's earlier songs were loosely based on the Buffy the Vampire Slayer characters Buffy, Dawn, and Faith.

Marsters' solo musical career was launched in October 2004, in London. His solo acoustic tour of the United Kingdom in April 2005 sold out. A new solo album "Civilized Man" produced by Chris Rhyne and Andrew Rosenthal was released on April 15, 2005. It includes several new songs as well as the popular "Katie" and "Smile". He has played songs from the album live in Detroit, Houston, and Sacramento. Ten of the eleven songs are written by Marsters. 

New solo songs not included on the album but sung at live solo concerts include "Birth of the Blues", "Finer than Gold", "Louise", and "London City". "Finer than Gold", "London City", and "Louise" were composed while on tour in the UK in April 2005. "Birth of the Blues" was composed by Marsters in Amsterdam in 2004 while touring with his now-defunct band. During his October 2005 mini-tour of the UK, Marsters introduced other new songs to his sets: "Button Down Vandals", "Up On Me", and "All That She Wanted". These songs were available only as part of his recently released Words and Music DVD, which has his abridged version of Macbeth as well as a full-length solo music performance. 

During his September 2006 convention, James Marsters & Friends, he debuted several new songs including "The Truth Is Heavy", "Fall of Night", "Jealous Man", and "Not A Millionaire". All these songs reflect his new blues music and folk sound. He also performed a cover version of Keb Mo's classic "Baby Blue". In 2007, he performed live several times in the UK and debuted two new songs written in Cardiff. "Layabout" and "Looking at You" reflect a more upbeat light folk move in Marsters' music. These songs as well as some of his previously unrecorded work were released on Marsters' second solo album, formally launched in Los Angeles and Cardiff in October and November 2007 respectively. This album, Like A Waterfall, includes twelve songs, all written by Marsters. Most had been performed and recorded live but not in the studio. An exception is "When I Was A Baby", a song never previously performed in public. 

Like A Waterfall was produced by Ryan Shore and features several other musicians including Blair Sinta, who has drummed for Alanis Morissette, and Five for Fighting bass player Curt Schneider. In 2008, Marsters' Waterfall Tour came to the UK. He played the first three dates across London and performed for three consecutive days in Milton Keynes. The concert at the packed Union Chapel in Islington was an acoustic set featuring material from his album—Like A Waterfall.

On May 1, 2009, he returned to the Union Chapel, followed by a "Marstersclass" event at The Drill Hall, in London on May 2. The sell-out event included a concert, Q&A session plus opportunities to get autographs and photos. On May 3, 2009, he performed at London's 100 Club.

In 2010 James' music career continued when the band Ghost of the Robot reformed: they have since released the album B-Sider which is available on iTunes. Afterwards, in 2011, the album Murphy's Law was released which is also available for download in iTunes. There are also multiple other EPs available on the iTunes Store.

Personal life
Marsters is divorced from Liane Davidson, with whom he has one son (born 1996). In 2002, Marsters began raising his five-year-old niece, whom he now regards as his daughter.

It was announced on May 21, 2010, that Marsters had proposed to girlfriend Patricia Rahman in Trier, Germany. On January 14, 2011, they married in a private civil ceremony in Los Angeles. In February 2021, the couple filed for divorce after nearly 10 years of marriage.

Discography

As a solo artist:

 Civilized Man (2005)
 Like a Waterfall (2007)

With California-based rock band Ghost of the Robot:

 Mad Brilliant (2003)
 B-Sider (2011)
 Murphy's Law (2011)
 Bourgeois Faux Pas (2015)
 Pair of Bulls, Vol.1 (2018)

Filmography

Film

Television

Video games

Audiobooks

Awards and nominations

References

External links

 
 
 411Mania interview (March 3, 2012)
 Gavin Schmitt interview (February 25, 2016)

1962 births
Living people
American baritones
American comics writers
American male film actors
American male television actors
American male video game actors
American male voice actors
Juilliard School alumni
Male actors from Modesto, California
Musicians from Modesto, California
Pacific Conservatory of the Performing Arts alumni
People from the San Francisco Bay Area
20th-century American male actors
21st-century American male actors